Aasif Sheikh (born 22 January 2001) is a Nepalese cricketer, who plays as right-handed wicket-keeper batsman. He made his debut for Nepal against Netherlands in April 2021.

He represents the Armed Police Force Club of the Kathmandu Mayor's Cup and Pokhara Paltan of the Pokhara Premier League.

Playing career 

Aasif plays for Panchakanya Tej in the Everest Premier League. He scored an unbeaten 111 runs in the final of the 2016 Everest Premier League as his team won the maiden EPL title. He was the leading run-scorer of the tournament, where he scored 202 runs in six matches at an average of 44.00.

He led the Nepalese Under-19 team in the 2018 Quadrangular Cricket Tournament in India. Later, he was named the skipper of the Nepal national under-19 cricket team for the 2018 ACC Under-19 Asia Cup. He also played for the Under-19 side in the 2019 ACC Under-19 Asia Cup.

He was the second leading run-scorer in the 2021 Prime Minister Cup, where he scored 206 runs in five innings at an average of 41.20. He was selected in the 18-member national team for the closed camps for the T20I series against Qatar but the tour was eventually postponed due to the increasing COVID-19 cases in Qatar.

Aasif was subsequently selected in the 15 members national squad for the 2020–21 Nepal Tri-Nation Series and made his T20I debut against Netherlands. He scored an unbeaten half-century and put up a record-breaking first-wicket partnership of 116 runs for Nepal in T20Is guiding his team to a 9-wicket victory. He scored 42 runs in the second match of the series against Malaysia and shared another century stand with a fellow opener Kushal Bhurtel. He scored 154 runs in the series at an average of 38.50 and a strike-rate of 138.73.

In August 2021, Aasif was named in Nepal's One Day International (ODI) squad for their series against Papua New Guinea in Oman, and their squad for round six of the 2019–2023 ICC Cricket World Cup League 2 tournament, also in Oman. He made his ODI debut on 7 September 2021, for Nepal against Papua New Guinea.

In March 2023, Sheikh scored his first century in ODIs during a match against Papua New Guinea.

Honours 
He was named as the recipient of the 2022 ICC Spirit of Cricket Award at the 2022 ICC Awards in recognition of his act on his decision not to runout Irish player Andy McBrine during a T20I fixture in February 2022 between Ireland and Nepal which was played as a part of the Quadrangular series which was held in Oman. McBrine collided with the bowler and fell down halfway up the pitch and Sheikh realised it and allowed McBrine to complete the run. Sheikh subsequently became the first player from Nepal to win the ICC's Spirit of Cricket Award.

References

External links 
 

Living people
2001 births
Nepalese cricketers
Nepal One Day International cricketers
Nepal Twenty20 International cricketers
People from Birgunj